"Moving Mountains" is a song recorded by American R&B singer Usher. It was released on May 23, 2008, as the third single from his fifth studio album, Here I Stand. It was written by Usher with Christopher "Tricky" Stewart, Kuk Harrell and The-Dream, and was produced by Stewart and The-Dream. "Moving Mountains" is a slow tempo ballad, with lyrics describing a love struggle.

The song appeared on the Billboard Hot 100 and Hot R&B/Hip-Hop Songs, as well as the single charts of several European countries. It peaked highest in New Zealand, where it reached number six on the singles chart and was certified gold. The music video for "Moving Mountains" was filmed in front of a green screen as a sequel to the video of "Love in This Club".

Background and composition

"Moving Mountains" was written by The-Dream, Christopher "Tricky" Stewart, Kuk Harrell and Usher, and produced by The-Dream and Stewart. Recorded at Triangle Sound Studios and Chalice Recording Studios, it was leaked in February 2008, before being officially released for sale on May 23, 2008.

"Moving Mountains" is a slow jam ballad, and contains synth beats and electronic influences. Portions of the song follow a chord progression used in OneRepublic's "Apologize". Partway through the song the beat is adjusted, while the musical instruments are accentuated. Usher's voice ranges from tenor to falsetto. The song's lyrics are of a "struggle to get through to his girl", and contain an extended metaphor, relating his fight for love to that of moving mountains, wishing for the situation to change. Fraser McAlpine from BBC called it "a cold, sad song with cold, sad lyrics".

Critical reception
Leah Greenblatt called it "an easy pick" as a single, while Sal Cinquemani of Slant Magazine lauded it as "further evidence that Usher always delivers musically". "Moving Mountains" was dubbed by The Guardian Rosie Swash "a marked improvement on the sex-pestery" of "Love in This Club", and the AbsolutePunk reviewer called it "one of Usher’s most impressive efforts to date", likening the song to Usher's 2004 single "Burn". However, while Alex Fletcher of Digital Spy was impressed with the technicalities of Usher's vocals, he found it "hard to take Usher completely seriously when he insists on wailing each line", advising Usher to "stick to party bangers in the future".

Chart performance
"Moving Mountains" debuted on the Billboard Hot 100 at number seventy-two on the chart date June 14, 2008. It peaked at number sixty-seven on August 2, 2008, falling off the chart two weeks later, after spending a total of nine weeks on the chart. The song is Usher's lowest-peaking song on the Hot 100. It fared better on the US Hot R&B/Hip-Hop Songs, where it peaked at number eighteen and spent seventeen weeks on the chart. It placed at number eighty-four on the end-of-year R&B/Hip-Hop Songs chart. "Moving Mountains" reached number fifty-six on the Pop 100.

The song appeared on the UK Singles Chart in July 2008 at number sixty-seven, rising to peak at number twenty-five. After thirteen charting weeks it fell off the chart. "Moving Mountains" was commercially well received in the rest of Europe, reaching the high point of number twenty-two on the European Hot 100 Singles. In individual countries, the song reached the top forty in Austria, Czech Republic, Germany, Ireland, Slovakia and Sweden. It also appeared on the Ultratop charts in both Flanders and Wallonia at number twenty. The song also had chart success in Japan and Australia, reaching the high positions of thirty-three and thirty-six, respectively. "Moving Mountains" had the most impact in New Zealand, where it reached number six on the singles chart, and, on March 29, 2009, was certified gold by the RIANZ for over 7,500 sales. The song ranked at number forty-seven on the New Zealand 2008 year-end Singles Chart.

Music video
The music video to "Moving Mountains" was released on May 21, 2008. Directed by the Brothers Strause, it is a continuation of the video for "Love in This Club". The video was shot in front of a green screen.

The video begins with Usher exiting the club in which the "Love in This Club" video takes place, then shows a fiery transition into the next scene, showing the burnt-down club. As the song begins, Usher inspects the smoking ruins and imagines a woman in a shard of a broken mirror. He travels through a desert, and takes off his jacket to reveal a tight-fitting t-shirt, and again imagines the woman, this time in a desert pond. Upon reaching a mountain on which his love interest appears, Usher climb the mountain and rain starts to fall. When he reaches the top of the mountain, the rain clears to be replaced by snowfall. Usher finds that the woman is, yet again, merely an illusion. He opens a locket to reveal a portrait of himself and his partner, which freezes over and cracks. As the video ends, Usher kneels, and the mountains breaks around him, leaving a sole pillar for him to stand on.

Idolator noted similarities in some scenery between the music video and Madonna's "Frozen" video. It was placed at number eight on BET's Notarized: Top 100 Videos of 2008 list.

Personnel

Kuk Harrell – writing, recording
The-Dream – writing, production
Christy Hall – assistant production
Jaycen Joshua – mixing

Dave Pensado – mixing
Christopher "Tricky" Stewart – writing, production
Usher – writing, vocals
Andrew Wuepper – assistant mixing

Source:

Track listings

CD single
 "Moving Mountains"
 "Moving Mountains" (instrumental)
 "Moving Mountains" (FP remix)
 "Moving Mountains" (J Remy & BobbyBass Remix)
 "Moving Mountains" (music video)

Japanese Remixes CD
 "Moving Mountains" (radio edit) – 4:00
 "Moving Mountains" (FP Remix) – 3:05
 "Moving Mountains" (J Remy & BobbyBass Remix) – 4:33
 "Moving Mountains" (Pokerface Remix) – 5:07
 "Moving Mountains" (23 Deluxe) – 5:58

UK CD Single
 "Moving Mountains" – 5:01
 "Love in This Club Part II" (featuring Beyoncé) – 4:19
Digital EP
 "Moving Mountains" – 4:57
 "Moving Mountains" (Full Phatt Remix) – 3:06
 "Moving Mountains" (Pokerface Remix) – 5:09
 "Moving Mountains" (23 Deluxe Remix) – 5:58

Finnish Digital EP
"Moving Mountains" – 4:57
"Moving Mountains" (instrumental) – 4:57
"Moving Mountains" (FP Remix) – 3:05
 "Moving Mountains" (Pokerface Remix) – 4:33

Charts and certifications

Charts

Year-end charts

Certifications

Release history

Purchase dates

Radio add dates

References

2008 singles
Usher (musician) songs
Contemporary R&B ballads
Songs written by Tricky Stewart
Song recordings produced by Tricky Stewart
Songs written by The-Dream
Songs written by Kuk Harrell
Songs written by Usher (musician)
2008 songs
2000s ballads
LaFace Records singles